Gale Arnot Brewer (born September 6, 1951) is an American Democratic politician from the state of New York who has represented the 6th New York City Council District since January 2022, a position she previously held from 2002 to 2013. From January 2014 to December 2021, she served as the 27th Borough President of the New York City borough of Manhattan.

Education
Brewer graduated from the Winsor School in Boston in 1969, and then obtained her undergraduate degrees from Bennington College in 1973 and Columbia University in 1997. She then earned her Master of Public Administration (M.P.A.) degree from Harvard University's John F. Kennedy School of Government.

Career
From 1975 to 1978, Brewer served as director of scheduling for Mary Anne Krupsak, the former Lieutenant Governor of New York. From 1978 to 1990, she was chief of staff to then-New York City Council member Ruth Messinger. From 1990 to 1994, Brewer was director of the New York City Office of Federal Relations in New York in the administration of David Dinkins. From 1994 to 1998, she was Deputy Public Advocate for Intergovernmental Affairs under Mark J. Green.

Brewer then served as Project Manager for the NYC Nonprofits Project and worked with the Telesis Corporation, a private firm that builds affordable housing. She was a member of Manhattan's Community Board 7 and Chair of the New York State chapter of the National Women's Political Caucus. In 2000, she was cited by the New York Daily News as #20 of "50 New Yorkers to Watch".

New York City Council (2002-2013)
Brewer began serving on the New York City Council in 2002. She represented the 6th district. In each re-election vote in 2003, 2005, and 2009, she received over 80% of the votes cast.

Brewer has helped to pass legislation protecting domestic workers, establishing the New York City Broadband Advisory Committee, establishing an electronic death registration system and requiring New York City publications to be made available via the Internet, as well as two bills aimed at eliminating graffiti and unwanted stickers.

Brewer chaired the Select Committee on Technology in Government (now the Committee on Technology) from 2002 to 2009 In June 2004, in conjunction with a graduate student Digital Opportunities Team at CUNY Hunter College departments of Urban Affairs and Planning supervised by Professor Lisa Tolliver, the committee published a study and recommendations titled Expanding Digital Opportunity in New York City Public Schools: Profiles of Innovators and Leaders Who Make a Difference. The report was one of numerous initiatives and events implemented by the Select Committee, which included roundtables, conferences, hearings, and collaborative partnerships.

Manhattan Borough President (2014-2021)
Brewer was ineligible to run for re-election to the City Council in 2013 because of term limits. In February 2013, Brewer announced she would run for Manhattan Borough President. On September 10, 2013, Brewer won the Democratic primary, taking nearly 40% of the vote in a four-way race. Brewer won the general election on Tuesday, November 5, 2013, and assumed office in January 2014.

Brewer was re-elected Manhattan Borough President in 2017. Due to term limits for borough presidents, she was ineligible to seek re-election in 2021. 

In the 2020 United States presidential election, Brewer served as an alternate elector, replacing Christine Quinn.

New York City Council (2022-present)
In December 2020, Brewer announced her candidacy for her former City Council seat in the 2021 New York City Council election. On November 2, 2021, Brewer defeated Republican Nancy Sliwa (wife of Curtis Sliwa) with over 82% of the vote.

Brewer chairs the City Council's Committee on Governmental Operations.  Other committees on which she serves include: Aging; Finance; General Welfare, Higher Education; Housing & Buildings; Mental Health; Technology; Transportation; and Waterfronts. In addition, she co-chairs the Manhattan Delegation, sits on the council's Budget Negotiating Team, and is a member of the Rules Committee Working Group.

Personal life
Brewer is married to Cal Snyder. Their son, Mo Sumbundu, works for Empire State Development. Brewer has had several foster children.

Electoral history

2013

2017

2021

References

External links

 Gale Brewer Facebook Page
 Gale Brewer Twitter Profile

1951 births
Bennington College alumni
Harvard Kennedy School alumni
Living people
Manhattan borough presidents
New York City Council members
New York (state) Democrats
Place of birth missing (living people)
Columbia University School of General Studies alumni
Women New York City Council members
Winsor School alumni
21st-century American women